Statistics of the Scottish Football League in season 1956–57.

Scottish League Division One

Scottish League Division Two

See also
1956–57 in Scottish football

References

 
Scottish Football League seasons